John Moore House is a historic home located near Lexington, Rockbridge County, Virginia. It was built in 1831, and is a two-story, three-bay Federal style brick dwelling.  It sits on a stone foundation and has a standing seam metal gable roof. The property also includes a contributing spring house (c. 1830).

It was listed on the National Register of Historic Places in 1999.

References

Houses on the National Register of Historic Places in Virginia
Federal architecture in Virginia
Houses completed in 1831
Houses in Rockbridge County, Virginia
National Register of Historic Places in Rockbridge County, Virginia
1831 establishments in Virginia